San Antonio is a  (community) in Higuillar which is one of the 6 barrios of Dorado, Puerto Rico.

See also
 List of communities in Puerto Rico

References

Barrios of Dorado, Puerto Rico